Robert Paul (20 April 1910 – 15 December 1998) was a French sprinter. He competed in the men's 100 metres at the 1936 Summer Olympics.

Competition record

References

External links
 

1910 births
1998 deaths
Athletes (track and field) at the 1936 Summer Olympics
French male sprinters
French male long jumpers
Olympic athletes of France
Place of birth missing
20th-century French people